Whitesville School, also known as Sherman District Junior High School, Whitesville Junior High School, and Whitesville Elementary School, is a historic school building located at Whitesville, Boone County, West Virginia. It was built in 1931, and is a two-story, blonde brick Art Deco style building. It sits on a raised basement and has an original two-story gymnasium/auditorium addition in the rear.  It features two entrance areas that extend from the main elevation and upward through the roofline in a "tower" formation.

It was listed on the National Register of Historic Places in 2013.

References

School buildings on the National Register of Historic Places in West Virginia
Art Deco architecture in West Virginia
School buildings completed in 1931
National Register of Historic Places in Boone County, West Virginia